The men's 100 metres at the 2011 IPC Athletics World Championships were held at the QEII Stadium from 22–26 January

Medalists

T11
The Men's 100 metres, T11 was held on January 22–23 and the medal ceremony on 24

T11 = visual impairment - range from no light perception, to light perception with the inability to recognise the shape of a hand.

Results

Heats
Qualification: First 1 in each heat(Q) and the next 1 fastest(q) advance to the final.

Key:   =CR = Equal Championship Record

Final

Key:   CR = Championship Record, SB = Season Best

T12

Results
The Men's 100 metres, T13 was held on January 26

T12 = may recognise the shape of a hand, have a visual acuity of 2/60 and/or visual field of less than 5 degrees.

Heats
Qualification: First 1 in each heat (Q) and the next 1 fastest (q) advance to the final.

Key:   CR = Championship Record

Final

T13

Results
The Men's 100 metres, T13 was held on January 23 and 24

T13 = visual impairment: visual acuity ranges from 2/60 to 6/60 and/or has a visual field of more than 5 degrees and less than 20 degrees.

Heats
Qualification: First 3 in each heat (Q) and the next 2 fastest (q) advance to the final.

Key:   SB = Season Best

Final

Key:   =AR = Equal Continental Record, SB = Season Best

T34
The Men's 100 metres, T34 was held on January 24 and 25

T34 = good functional strength, minimal limitation or control problems in the arms or trunk, compete in a wheelchair or from a throwing frame.

Results

Heats
Qualification: First 3 in each heat (Q) and the next 2 fastest (q) advance to the final.

Key:   CR = Championship Record, SB = Season Best

Final

Key:   AR = Continental Record, SB = Season Best

T35

The Men's 100 metres, T13 was held on January 24

T35 = good static balance, problems in dynamic balance. May need assistive device for walking, not when standing.

Results

Final

Key:   CR = Championship Record, SB = Season Best

T36
The Men's 100 metres, T36 was held on January 23 and 24

T36 = walk without assistance or assistive devices, more control problems with upper than lower limbs. All four limbs are involved, dynamic balance often better than static balance.

Results

Heats
Qualification: First 3 in each heat (Q) and the next 2 fastest (q) advance to the final.

Key:   SB = Season Best

Final

Key:   CR = Championship Record, AR = Continental Record, SB = Season Best

T37
The Men's 100 metres, T37 was held on January 23 and 24

T37 = spasticity in an arm and leg on the same side, good functional ability on the other side, better development, good arm and hand control.

Results

Heats
Qualification: First 3 in each heat (Q) and the next 2 fastest (q) advance to the final.

Key:   CR = Championship Record, AR = Continental Record, SB = Season Best

Final

Key:   WR = World Record, SB = Season Best

T38
The Men's 100 metres, T38 was held on January 23 and 24

T38 = meet the minimum disability criteria for athletes with cerebral palsy, head injury or stroke, a limitation in function that impacts on sports performance.

Results

Heats
Qualification: First 3 in each heat (Q) and the next 2 fastest (q) advance to the final.

Key:   CR = Championship Record, SB = Season Best

Final

Key:  CR = Championship Record, SB = Season Best, R 162.7 = False start

T42
The Men's 100 metres, T42 was held on January 26

T42 = single above knee amputation or equivalent impairment.

Results

Final

Key:   CR = Championship Record, AR = Continental Record,  SB = Season Best

T44
The Men's 100 metres, T44 was held on January 25 and 26

American Jerome Singleton won the race, causing South African Oscar Pistorius to lose an international 100 metres race for the first time in seven years.

T44 = single below knee amputation or equivalent impairment.

Also T43 classified athletes competed in this event: double below knee amputations or equivalent impairments.

Results

Heats
Qualification: First 2 in each heat(Q) and the next 2 fastest(q) advance to the final.

Final

Key:   SB = Season Best, R 162.7 = False start

T46
The Men's 100 metres, T46 was held on January 25 and 26

T46 = single above or below elbow amputation or equivalent impairments.

Also T45 classified athletes competed in this event: double arm amputations above or below the elbow or equivalent impairments.

Results

Heats
Qualification: First 3 in each heat(Q) and the next 2 fastest(q) advance to the final.

Key:   DNS = Did not Start

Final

Key:   WR = World Record, CR = Championship Record, SB = Season Best, DQ = Disqualified, R 162.7 = False start

T51
The Men's 100 metres, T53 was held on January 28 and 29

T51 = a weakness in shoulder function, can bend but not straighten the elbow joint, no trunk or leg function, no movement in the fingers, can bend wrists backwards but not forwards.

Results

Final

Key:   CR = Championship Record, SB = Season Best

T52
The Men's 100 metres, T52 was held on January 28 and 29

T52 = good shoulder, elbow and wrist function, poor to normal finger flexion and extension, no trunk or leg function.

Results

Final

Key:   CR = Championship Record, AR = Continental Record, SB = Season Best

T53
The Men's 100 metres, T53 was held on January 22 and 23

T53 = normal upper limb function, no abdominal, leg or lower spinal function.

Results

Heats
Qualification: First 3 in each heat (Q) and the next 2 fastest (q) advance to the final.

Final

Key:   WR = World Record, CR = Championship Record, AR = Continental Record, PB = Personal Best, SB = Season Best

T54
The Men's 100 metres, T13 was held on January 28 and 29

T54 = normal upper limb function, partial to normal trunk function, may have significant function of the lower limbs.

Results

Heats
Qualification: First 3 in each heat (Q) and the next 4 fastest (q) advance to the semifinals.

Key:   CR = Championship Record, R 162.7 = False start

Semifinals
Qualification: First 3 in each heat (Q) and the next 2 fastest (q) advance to the final.

Key:   CR = Championship Record, R 162.7 = False start

Final

Key:   CR = Championship Record

See also
2011 IPC Athletics World Championships – Men's pentathlon
List of IPC world records in athletics

References
General
Complete Results Book from the 2011 IPC Athletics World Championships
Schedule and results, Official site of the 2011 IPC Athletics World 
Championships
IPC Athletics Classification Explained, Scottish Disability Sport
Specific

External links
ParalympicSport.TV on YouTube
2011 IPC Athletics World Championships: Big Guns Preview - 100m (T44)
2011 IPC Athletics World Championships: Men's 100m T44
IPC Athletics World Championships: Mens 100m T34
2011 IPC Athletics World Championships: Men's 100m T36

100 metres
100 metres at the World Para Athletics Championships